Raymond J. McNulty is an American educator who served as Vermont Commissioner of Education from 2001 to 2003.

Education 
McNulty earned a B.A. from Bridgewater State University in 1973 and an M.A. from Johnson State College in 1977.

Career 
McNulty had been an educator for 28 years before assuming office as Vermont Commissioner of Education. In 2002, Marlboro College awarded McNulty an honorary doctorate.

Since leaving government, McNulty has served as chief learning officer at Penn Foster College, Dean of the School of Education at Southern New Hampshire University, and is currently president of the International Center for Leadership in Education. McNulty was also a senior fellow at the Bill & Melinda Gates Foundation. He began an earlier association with the foundation while still serving as Vermont Commissioner of Education. McNulty was succeeded by Richard Cate.

References

External links
 ICLE 
 AIE Speakers Bureau Raymond McNulty
 On You Tube – Ray McNulty: A Look At Change and Shaping the Way We Define Success

Living people
Bridgewater State University alumni
Johnson State College alumni
Education in Vermont
Southern New Hampshire University faculty
Year of birth missing (living people)